Jarred Phillips (born 14 May 1995) is a Canadian professional soccer player who currently plays for the Simcoe County Rovers of League1 Ontario.

Club career

Vaughan Azzurri
From 2016 to 2019, Phillips played with Vaughan Azzurri in League1 Ontario. He scored his first goal in a 4–3 victory on June 11 against Master's FA. He won the 2016 League1 Ontario title with Vaughan, appeared in both legs of the 2016 Inter-Provincial Cup against PLSQ champions Mont-Royal Outremont, and was named a league Second Team All-Star. In 2017, he was again named a Second Team All-Star. In 2018, he was named a league First Team All-Star, helping Vaughan to capture the League and Cup double.

In the winter of 2018, he played in the Major Arena Soccer League with Mississauga MetroStars. In 2019, he played all 180 minutes of both legs of Vaughan's Canadian Championship series against HFX Wanderers. In 2020, he was named to the League1 Ontario All-Time Best XI.

Toronto Croatia  
In the summer of 2019, he participated in the Croatian World Club Championship with Toronto Croatia where he assisted the Croats in advancing to the tournament finals by recording a goal against Vojvođanski Hrvata. He played in the championship finals where Toronto lost the match in a penalty shootout to SC Croat San Pedro.

Atlético Ottawa
On 10 August 2020, Phillips signed his first professional contract with Canadian Premier League expansion side Atlético Ottawa. He made his debut in Ottawa's inaugural match on August 15 against York9. On 26 February 2021, he was released by Ottawa.

Return to Vaughan Azurri
After departing Ottawa Phillips returned to the Vaughan Azzurri for the 2021 League1 Ontario season, helping them with the East Division and being named an East Division All-Star.

Simcoe County Rovers
In January 2022, the Simcoe County Rovers announced they had signed Phillips, ahead of their inaugural season in League1 Ontario.

Career statistics

References

External links

1995 births
Living people
Association football defenders
Canadian soccer players
Atlético Ottawa players
League1 Ontario players
Canadian Premier League players
Vaughan Azzurri players
Simcoe County Rovers FC players
Mississauga MetroStars players
Toronto Croatia players
Major Arena Soccer League players